Providence may refer to a number of ships:

 , of 238 tons (bm), was launched at New Brunswick. In 1791–1792 she made one voyage to the British Southern Whale Fishery. 
  was launched in 1790 at South Shields. She initially traded with Saint Petersburg but then in 1804 the British Royal Navy hired her. She remained in Royal Navy service until towards the end of 1812. She disappears from the registers between 1812 and 1820, and between 1835 and 1850. She was wrecked in 1869 and broken up in 1870.
 , a sailing ship built at Calcutta that made three voyages for the British East India Company, including one transporting convicts to New South Wales
 ,  a 380-ton sailing ship built at Lynn in 1812 that twice transported convicts to Tasmania, and that was wrecked in January 1828.
 , a 2,962-gross register ton sidewheel steamer built at New York in 1866
 , a Royal Navy vessel
 
 

Ship names